Fuzhou or Fu Prefecture was a zhou (prefecture) in imperial China, centering on modern Wafangdian, Liaoning, China. It existed (intermittently) from early 11th century until 1913. During the Qing dynasty between 1726 and 1733 it was known as Fuzhou Subprefecture.

References
 

Prefectures of the Liao dynasty
Prefectures of the Jin dynasty (1115–1234)
Subprefectures of the Ming dynasty
Prefectures of the Qing dynasty
Former prefectures in Liaoning